Victor Gómez Javalera (born 10 February 1974) is an Andorran alpine skier. He competed at the 1992, 1994, 1998 and the 2002 Winter Olympics.

Notes

References

External links
 

1974 births
Living people
Andorran male alpine skiers
Olympic alpine skiers of Andorra
Alpine skiers at the 1992 Winter Olympics
Alpine skiers at the 1994 Winter Olympics
Alpine skiers at the 1998 Winter Olympics
Alpine skiers at the 2002 Winter Olympics
People from Andorra la Vella